Gunnar Isidor Sundman (15 April 1893 – 20 July 1946) was a Swedish swimmer. He competed at the 1912 Summer Olympics in the 100 m backstroke event, but failed to reach the final.

Sundman later immigrated to the United States where he continued to swim and worked as an engineer with the California Department of Transportation. He served in World War I.

References

1893 births
1946 deaths
Olympic swimmers of Sweden
Swimmers at the 1912 Summer Olympics
Swedish male backstroke swimmers
Stockholms KK swimmers
Swimmers from Stockholm
20th-century Swedish people